Paskah Rose (died 28 May 1686), also known as Pascha Rose, was an English executioner briefly during 1686, successor to Jack Ketch.

Rose was a butcher by trade. He had been Ketch's assistant during the period of the Bloody Assizes. When Ketch was imprisoned for "affronting" a London sheriff, Rose was appointed in his place. A few months after taking over Rose was arrested for robbery, after he and another man had broken into the house of a William Barnet and stolen "a Cambler coat and other apparrel". He was hanged at Tyburn on 28 May 1686, following which Ketch was reinstated for the remaining few months of his life.

References 
Notes

Bibliography

Further reading
 

Year of birth missing
1686 deaths
English executioners
Executed English people
People executed by Stuart England
People executed by the Kingdom of England by hanging
17th-century executions by England